Matteo Grandi (born 12 October 1992) is an Italian football player who plays for  club Sangiuliano.

Club career
Grandi was a youth product of A.C. Cesena. He spent the first few seasons on loan to other clubs. He made his professional debut in the Lega Pro Prima Divisione for Südtirol on 2 September 2012 in a game against AlbinoLeffe.

After the bankruptcy of both A.C. Cesena and Vicenza Calcio, Grandi signed a new contract with L.R. Vicenza Virtus (formerly Bassano Virtus until May 2018), a club that he spent 2017–18 season on loan.

On 13 January 2023, Grandi signed a 1.5-year contract with Sangiuliano.

References

External links
 

1992 births
People from Faenza
Living people
Italian footballers
A.C. Cesena players
F.C. Südtirol players
U.S. Pergolettese 1932 players
Bassano Virtus 55 S.T. players
U.S. Catanzaro 1929 players
Latina Calcio 1932 players
L.R. Vicenza players
F.C. Sangiuliano City players
Serie B players
Serie C players
Association football goalkeepers
Footballers from Emilia-Romagna
Sportspeople from the Province of Ravenna